Lou is a unisex given name. For males, it is frequently a short form (hypocorism) of Louis or Lewis, for females of Louise, etc. It may refer to:

People

Men
 Lou Adler (born 1933), American record producer, music executive, talent manager, songwriter and film director and producer
 Lou Albano (1933–2009), Italian-American professional wrestler, manager and actor
 Lou Bega (born 1975), German singer
 Lou Boudreau (1917–2001), American Hall of Fame baseball player
 Lou Brock (1939–2020), American Hall-of-Fame Major League Baseball player
 Lou Busch (1910–1979), American musician and songwriter
 Lou Costello, stage name of American actor and comedian Louis Cristillo (1906-1959)
 Lou Diamond Phillips, American actor and director born James Diamond in 1962
 Lou Dobbs (born 1945), American television anchor, radio host and author
 Lou Ferrigno (born 1951), American bodybuilder and actor
 Lou Ferrigno Jr. (born 1984), American actor
 Lou Frizzell (1920–1979), American actor and music director
 Lou Gehrig (1903–1941), American Hall-of-Fame Major League Baseball player
 Lou Gordon (American football) (1908–1976), American National Football League player
 Lou Gordon (journalist) (1917–1977), American radio and television commentator and newspaper reporter
 Lou Gramm, stage name of American rock singer and songwriter Louis Grammatico (b. 1950)
 Lou Harrison (1917–2003), American composer
 Lou Henson (1932–2020), American basketball coach
 Lou Holtz (born 1937), American former football player, coach and analyst
 Lou Jacobi (1913–2009), Canadian actor
 Lou Jacobs (1903–1992), German-American circus clown
 Lou Johnson (1934–2020), American baseball player
 Lou Johnson (pitcher) (1869–1941), American baseball pitcher
 Lou Johnson (singer) (1941–2019), American soul singer and pianist
 Lou Kenton (1908–2012), English proofreader
 Lou Kilzer (born 1951), American journalist
 Lou Kolls (1892–1941), American baseball umpire
 Lou Marini (born 1945), American saxophonist, arranger and composer
 Lou Merrill (1912–1963), American actor
 Lou Piniella (born 1943), American former Major League Baseball player and manager
 Lou Preager (1906–1978), British dance band leader
 Lou Rawls (1933–2006), American singer, songwriter and record producer
 Lou Reed (1942–2013), American musician, singer and songwriter
 Lou Reed (rugby player) (born 1987), Welsh rugby union footballer
 Lou Richards (1923–2017), Australian rules footballer and sports journalist
 Lou Silver, American-Israeli basketball player
 Lou Thesz (1916–2002), American professional wrestler
 Lou Vairo (born 1945), American ice hockey coach
 Lou Viglione, former NASCAR Cup Series team owner
 Lou Vincent (born 1945), New Zealand cricket player
 Lou Williams (born 1986), American National Basketball Association player

Women
 Lou (German singer), stage name of Louise Hoffner (born 1963), German pop singer
 Lou Andreas-Salomé (1861–1937), Russian-born psychoanalyst and author
 Lou Doillon (born 1982), French singer-songwriter, actress, and model
 Lou Fellingham (born 1974), English contemporary Christian singer and songwriter
 Lou Henry Hoover (1874–1944), wife of US President Herbert Hoover
 Louise "Lou" Lieberman (born 1977), American soccer coach and former player
 Lou Sanders, British comedian
 Lou Wotton (born 1983), Australian rules footballer

Fictional TV characters
 Lou Beale, on the BBC soap opera EastEnders
 Lou Grant, on The Mary Tyler Moore Show and Lou Grant
 Lou Solverson, on the FX TV show Fargo
 Lou, a policeman on The Simpsons
 Lou, a female Flashman on Choushinsei Flashman

English unisex given names
Unisex given names
Hypocorisms